A-Teen 2 is a 2019 South Korean streaming television series which is the sequel to the 2018 web series A-Teen. It aired on Naver TV Cast from April 25 to June 30, 2019, on Thursdays and Sundays at 19:00 (KST).

The web series accumulated 35 million views within two weeks of its premiere. To celebrate this achievement, part of the cast held a fan meeting on June 13, 2019. As of September 2019, the Korean and English version of the series on YouTube have a combined view count of 60 million views.

Synopsis
The story of seven students who learn the joys and hardships of being 19-year-olds.

Introduction 
A story containing the sincerity of living every moment in countless worries and choices, A true school life that adds to the curiosity with students.

Cast

Main
 Lee Na-eun as Kim Ha-na/Kim Jo-yeon
 Choi Bo-min as Ryu Joo-ha
 Shin Ye-eun as Do Ha-na
 Shin Seung-ho as Nam Shi-woo
 Kim Dong-hee as Ha Min
 Kim Su-hyeon as Yeo Bo-ram
 Ryu Ui-hyun as Cha Gi-hyun
 Kang Min-ah as Cha Ah-hyun

Supporting
 Ahn Jung-hoon as Nam Ji-woo
 Cho Young-in as Kim Min-ji

Cameo appearances
 Hyungseo as a student (Ep. 2)
 Joshua as Ryu Joo-ha's friend (Ep. 7 ss2)
 Baek Soo-hee as Lee Jeong-min (Ep. 8)
 Jeon Hye-yeon as Park Jin-ho (Ep. 11)
 Kim Min-ju as a restaurant employee (Ep. 11)
 Hyunjin as Cha Ah-Hyun's friends (Ep. 16)
 I.N as Cha Ah-Hyun's friends (Ep. 16)

Original soundtrack

Part 1

Part 2

Part 3

List of episodes

Awards 
 2019 V Live Awards-The Most Loved Web Series Awards
 2019 V Live Awards-Favorite Web Series Actor Awards (Lee Na-eun, Choi Bo-min)

References

External links
 
 

South Korean drama web series
2019 web series debuts
2019 web series endings
Naver TV original programming
Playlist Studio original programming
Television series about teenagers